Ivankovo is a rural locality (a selo) in Botanovskoye Rural Settlement, Mezhdurechensky District, Vologda Oblast, Russia. The population was 5 as of 2002.

Geography 
Ivankovo is located 43 km southwest of Shuyskoye (the district's administrative centre) by road. Yekimovo is the nearest rural locality.

References 

Rural localities in Mezhdurechensky District, Vologda Oblast